Mediaskare Records is an American independent record label specializing in heavy metal music. The label was founded by Baron Bodnar, with its offices located in Los Angeles, California. The label's prominent artists include Volumes, Bury Your Dead, and Silent Civilian.

In February 2008, it was announced that Mediaskare entered a partnership with Century Media Records. The deal centered on new marketing and distribution for Mediaskare artists. In late 2010, the label broke apart from Century Media for distribution and joined Suburban Noize/RED. In 2014, the label faced media scrutiny for label artist Reformers' lyrics relating to homosexuality, and released a statement defending freedom of artistic expression in response.

Artist list
Bermuda
Deserters
Endwell
Exotic Animal Petting Zoo
Hero In Error
Murder Death Kill
Mureau
Polarization
The Prestige
Red Enemy
Reformers
Reign Supreme
Runaway Kids (formerly known as Betrayal)
Silent Civilian
Ugly Colors

Rite of Passage Records artists 
Aristeia
Adaliah
Darasuum
Truth & Its Burden
Wrath of Vesuvius

Former Mediaskare bands
The Ability  (disbanded)
Adaliah (disbanded|Mediaskare 2018)
Ambush!
Antagonist A.D. (active, unsigned)
As Blood Runs Black
A Breath Before Surfacing (On Hiatus)
Belay My Last (Disbanded 2008)
Betrayal (now known as Runaway Kids)
Blind Witness (active, unsigned)
Blood Stands Still
Burning The Masses (On Hiatus)
Bury Your Dead (Active on Stay Sick Recordings)
Contra (Disbanded 2007)
Creations (active)
The Demonstration (Active)
The Ghost Inside (Active on Epitaph Records)
Hundredth (Active on Hopeless Records)
It Prevails (Active on Stay Sick Recordings)
King Conquer (active, unsigned)
The Last Of Our Kind (Disbanded 2012; never released album with Mediaskare)
Lionheart
Lose None (On Hiatus)
Martyrdom   (Disbanded 2010)
The Messenger (Disbanded)
The Miles Between (Disbanded)
The Prestige (Disbanded)
Truth & Its Burden (Active, unsigned)
Redeemer (Disbanded 2015)
The Red Shore (Disbanded 2011)
The Sheds (disbanded 2015)
Sovereign Strength (Disbanded 2012)
Stand Your Ground (Active, Unsigned)
Suffokate (active, unsigned)
Volumes (active on  Fearless Records)
With Dead Hands Rising (Disbanded 2009)

References

External links
 Official site

American independent record labels
Death metal record labels